The 1930 Newberry Indians football team represented Newberry College as a member the Southern Intercollegiate Athletic Association (SIAA) during the 1930 college football season. Led by eleventh-year head coach Dutch McClean, the Indians compiled an overall record of 0–5–3, with a mark of 0–2–1 in conference play.

Schedule

References

Newberry
College football winless seasons
Newberry Indians football